Xu Rongmao  (born 1950), or Hui Wing Mau in Cantonese, is a Chinese-Australian entrepreneur and billionaire, and the founder and the chairman of Shimao Property. Xu is estimated to be one of the largest property developers in Shanghai. According to Forbes in 2021, his net worth is estimated at $10.3bn.

Biography
Xu was born in Shishi, Fujian Province, the oldest of the eight children. After graduating from high school during the Cultural Revolution in the 1960s, he was sent to the countryside to work as a barefoot doctor. In the 1970s, he emigrated to Hong Kong and worked as a textile worker.

Property development
In 1988, he claimed to invest  million in a knitting factory in his hometown, but he intended to build a hotel instead, although investments in private hotels were forbidden at that time. However, as soon as the construction was completed, the government policy was changed to allow private owners to have their hotels. Then Xu became the owner of the first private three-star hotel in China. He then started to invest into developing residential complexes and resorts in Fujian.

In the 1990s, he pushed his real estate business into Beijing and Shanghai. He undertook several property ventures in Australia in the 1990s. He completed his Master of Business Administration via distance-learning from the University of Adelaide and invested in real estate in the early 1990s. During the 2003-04-year, Xu was the largest individual donor to the NSW branch of the Australian Labor Party.

In the 2000s (decade), he expanded his business by acquiring listed companies including Shimao Holdings (listed on the Shanghai Stock Exchange) and Shimao International (previously listed on the Hong Kong Stock Exchange), while the latter was privatized by him in 2007. Shimao Property was listed on the Hong Kong Stock Exchange in 2006.

Personal life

In 2008, Xu was reported to be interested in buying Newcastle United F.C. from then owner Mike Ashley.

Net worth
Xu's net worth is compiled on the Financial Review Rich List, the Forbes China Rich List, and the Hurun Report China Rich List.

References

External links 
 Shimao Group
 Shimao Property
 

1950 births
Living people
Hokkien people
People from Shishi, Fujian
Billionaires from Fujian
Businesspeople from Fujian
Australian billionaires
Chinese emigrants to Australia
Australian businesspeople
Members of the National Committee of the Chinese People's Political Consultative Conference
Members of the Election Committee of Hong Kong, 2017–2021
Members of the Election Committee of Hong Kong, 2021–2026
Chinese real estate businesspeople
Naturalised citizens of Australia